Goodenia dimorpha is a species of flowering plant in the family Goodeniaceae and is endemic to the Sydney region. It is an erect herb with adventitious roots, linear to egg-shaped leaves, mostly at the base of the plant, and panicles of yellow flowers.

Description

Taxonomy
Goodenia dimorpha was first formally described in 1904 by Joseph Maiden and Ernst Betche in the Proceedings of the Linnean Society of New South Wales. In 1990, Roger Charles Carolin selected the lectotype as material collected by Betche near Woodford in 1899.

In the same journal, Maiden and Betche described two varieties, and the names are accepted by the Australian Plant Census:
 Goodenia dimorpha var. angustifolia Maiden & Betche has linear leaves and mainly flowers from November to June;
 Goodenia dimorpha Maiden & Betche var. dimorpha has egg-shaped leaves with the narrower end towards the base and mostly flowers from October to March.

Distribution and habitat
This goodenia in swampy ground on sandstone plateaus. Variety angustifolia occurs from the Gosford district to Waterfall and var. dimorpha mainly near Blackheath in the Blue Mountains.

References

dimorpha
Flora of New South Wales
Asterales of Australia
Taxa named by Joseph Maiden
Taxa named by Ernst Betche
Plants described in 1904